A list of films produced in Hong Kong in 2001:

2001

References

External links
 IMDB list of Hong Kong films
 Hong Kong films of 2001 at HKcinemamagic.com

2000
Lists of 2001 films by country or language
2001 in Hong Kong